Thein Tut (also spelt Thein Htut, born 13 November 1955) is a Burmese former dental professor at the University of Dental Medicine, Yangon. He was also the president of the Myanmar Dental Association (MDA) from 2009 to 2011.

Early life and education
Thein Tut was born in Yangon, Myanmar on 13 November 1955. He graduated from University of Dental Medicine, Yangon in July 1965. He received Ph.D from Japan in 1995.

See also
 Myanmar Dental Association
 Myanmar Dental Council
 University of Dental Medicine, Mandalay
 University of Dental Medicine, Yangon

References 

Burmese dental professors
1955 births
Living people